André van Aert (born 23 May 1940) is a Dutch former racing cyclist. He rode in the 1964 Tour de France and the 1964 Vuelta a España.

Major results
1961
 1st Ronde van Zuid-Holland

References

1940 births
Living people
Dutch male cyclists
Cyclists from Zundert